Chess warriors was a TV programme in 2001. It has a mixture of action and romance in the programme.

Cast 
張衛健 (Dicky Cheung) as Xuē Yípiào (薛一驃)- the red horse (later)
樊亦敏 as Lěng Yàn (冷豔)- the red Minister (later)
黃文豪 as Yuè Huáixiān (岳懷仙)- the red chariot and then the Marshal (later)
何美鈿 (He Meitian) as Yè Yèxīn (葉夜心)- the red advisor
車軒 as Lěng Zijīng (冷子京)- the King's chancellor
沈孟生 as Bā Léiwǔ (巴雷武)- the red chariot (later)

Story 
The story starts with a match of chinese chess between the King of China (in red pawns) and the King of Khitan (in black pawns). However, this match uses real people on the chess board. When the match starts, the King keeps on losing his pawns and begins to get upset. This is because of his "loyal" chancellor who works for the King of Khitan behind people's back. On the other hand, Xuē Yípiào, a lover and expert of Chinese chess is watching the match outside the palace, while observing the match. he started to sigh and saying out loud that the King is an idiot.

At the nearly end of the match, there are only two pawns left, the chariot and the minister of the red. The chariot, Yuè Huáixiān is the most well-trained one out of the others, he managed to defeat a few black pawns. Seeing this, the chancellor starts to get annoyed, planning to kill him if he doesn't die in this match. The chariot of the blacks started to fight with him and the tired Yuè Huáixiān cannot stand the attacks and so he falls off his chariot. The black chariot, takes this chance and tries to kill him but Yuè Huáixiān manages to block some of his attacks although at the end, he loses his right arm after being run over by the black chariot's wheel while he attempts to dodge an attack. The pawn is taken down on the chessboard outside the palace and the people starts to get worried as they were excited when a few black pawns were taken down off the board. Yè Yèxīn the daughter of the general of the red pawns who is a close friend of Yuè Huáixiān gets more worried than any others. Even after losing his arm, yuè huái xiān attempts to protect the general. Just before the black chariot gives the last attack to the minister, the King of China stops the match by admitting that he has lost. And the King of Khitan says that next time, whoever loses the match must call the winner father.

Yuè Huáixiān and the general are taken away to the doctor in the palace. However, the chancellor thinks of a plan to kill them both. He uses the name of the King behind his back that they are to be planked till their death and their families kicked out of the city. Yuè Huáixiān manages to live where the general doesn't, Yuè Huáixiān is then thrown into pigpen, leaving him to die. Xuē Yípiào passes by the pigpen and notices the blood-soaked Yuè Huáixiān. He carries Yuè Huáixiān home to his blind mother. Yè Yèxīn and her mother are being forced out of the city; Yè Yèxīn escapes the chancellor's son but her mother is killed in the attempt to safe her daughter.

Yuè Huáixiān becomes friend with Xuē Yípiào and the adventure begins. After meeting Yè Yèxīn, Xuē Yípiào starts to like her.

After knowing that Yuè Huáixiān still lives, the chancellor orders his daughter, Lěng Yàn to kill him. Lěng Yàn orders the killer, Bā Léiwǔ and Lěng Yàn instead she pays him and stands and watches. She later sees a lot about Yuè Huáixiān and starts to doubt her father about Yuè Huái iān being a traitor. This makes Lěng Yàn want to get closer to him and she ends up falling in love with Yuè Huáixiān and doesn't tell him the fact that she is the daughter of the chancellor and Yè Yèxīn becomes jealous of Lěng Yàn. After discovering that Lěng Yàn is the daughter of the chancellor, Yuè Huái Xiān starts to distant from her. Lěng Yàn starts to get on really well with Xuē Yípiào and they call each other pals. And later on the story, she starts to notice that she has feeling for him.

On the other hand, Yè Yèxīn starts to forgive for what Yuè Huáixiān did and they become close again.

Chinese television shows
Works by Kuo Cheng